KHCK (91.3 FM) is a radio station licensed to Houck, Arizona, United States. The station is currently owned by Advance Ministries.

References

External links
 

HCK